The men's bantamweight event was part of the boxing programme at the 1928 Summer Olympics. The weight class was the second-lightest contested, and allowed boxers of up to 118 pounds (53.5 kilograms). The competition was held from Tuesday, August 7, 1928 to Saturday, August 11, 1928.

Results

References

External links
 International Olympic Committee medal database
 Amateur Boxing

Bantamweight